Jaime Chris López Alvarado (born 17 September 1979) is a Mexican politician affiliated with the PRI. He previously served as Deputy of the LXII Legislature of the Mexican Congress representing Baja California, as well as the XIX Legislature of the Congress of Baja California.

References

1979 births
Living people
Politicians from Tijuana
Institutional Revolutionary Party politicians
21st-century Mexican politicians
Universidad Iberoamericana alumni
Members of the Congress of Baja California
Deputies of the LXII Legislature of Mexico
Members of the Chamber of Deputies (Mexico) for Baja California